Mahonia incerta is a shrub described as a species in 1901. It is endemic to eastern Mexico, known from the States of Hidalgo and Veracruz.

References

incerta
Endemic flora of Mexico
Plants described in 1901
Cloud forest flora of Mexico
Flora of the Sierra Madre Oriental